The 25th Artistic Gymnastics World Championships were held in Stuttgart, West Germany, in 1989 from October 14 to October 22.

The scoring rule New Life was introduced. This meant that gymnasts' scores were not carried over to the all-around and the event finals from the team competition.

Results

Men

Team Final

All-around

Floor Exercise

Pommel Horse

Rings

Vault

Parallel Bars

Horizontal Bar

Women

Team Final

All-around

Vault 
Brandy Johnson was awarded scores of 9.937 and 9.950 for her two vaults in competition, giving her an average score of 9.943, enough for third place and the bronze medal, which was presented to her at the medal ceremony. Subsequently, however, the judges accepted a protest from the USA and revised her score to an average of 9.950, to share second place with Cristina Bontaș. She returned to the arena to be awarded her silver medal before the medal ceremony for uneven bars.

Uneven Bars

Balance Beam

Floor Exercise

Medals

Overall

Men

Women

Opening Event
The opening event was created and organised by Traumfabrik

References

Gymn Forum: World Championships Results
Gymnastics
Traumfabrik.de

World Artistic Gymnastics Championships
G
World Artistic Gymnastics Championships
1989 in gymnastics
20th century in Baden-Württemberg
International gymnastics competitions hosted by West Germany